Ben Robertson (born 14 August 1971) is a former Australian rules footballer who played for the Carlton Football Club in the Australian Football League (AFL). Robertson played three senior games in his first season with Carlton, but was unable break into the senior side in 1993 or 1994 and was delisted at the conclusion of the 1994 season. In 1995, he moved to South Australia to play for North Adelaide in the South Australian National Football League.

Notes

External links

Ben Robertson's profile at Blueseum

1971 births
Carlton Football Club players
Living people
Australian rules footballers from Victoria (Australia)
North Adelaide Football Club players